Alan P. Venook is an American physician, currently the Shorenstein Associate Director for Program Development, Professor and Madden Family Distinguished Professor at Helen Diller Comprehensive Cancer Center, University of California, San Francisco.

References

Year of birth missing (living people)
Living people
University of California, San Francisco faculty
University of California, San Francisco alumni
University of California, Davis alumni
American oncologists